"How now brown cow" is a phrase used in elocution teaching to demonstrate rounded vowel sounds. Each "ow" in the phrase represents the diphthong /aʊ/. English orthography also uses the homophonic spelling "ou" to represent this diphthong in words like "noun" and "cloud". The use of the phrase "how now brown cow" in teaching elocution can be traced back to at least 1926.

The phrase how now itself is an archaic greeting or interrogative expression.

References 

Greetings